Nights in the Gardens of Spain, G. 49, is a piece of music by the Spanish composer Manuel de Falla.   Falla was Andalusian and the work refers to the Hispano-Arabic past of this region (Al-Andalus).

Falla began this work as a set of nocturnes for solo piano in 1909, but on the suggestion of the pianist Ricardo Viñes he turned the nocturnes into a piece for piano and orchestra. Falla completed it in 1915 and dedicated it to Viñes. However the pianist at the first performance was neither Viñes nor Falla (who was a skilled pianist), but José Cubiles. The first performance was given on April 9, 1916, at Madrid's Teatro Real, with the Orquesta Sinfónica de Madrid conducted by Enrique Fernández Arbós.

Viñes first played the work in its San Sebastián premiere, shortly after the world premiere, with the same orchestra. Arthur Rubinstein was in the audience that night, and he introduced the work to Buenos Aires.  The Paris premiere took place in January 1920, with the pianist Joaquín Nin playing under Fernández Arbós. The composer himself was the soloist at the London premiere in 1921, at a Queen's Hall concert under the baton of Edward Clark.

The work depicts three gardens:
  (In the Generalife): The first gardens are in the Generalife, the jasmine-scented gardens surrounding the  Alhambra.
  (A Distant Dance): The second garden is an unidentified distant one in which there is an exotic dance.
  (In the Gardens of the Sierra de Córdoba): The third set of gardens are in the Sierra de Córdoba.

The score calls for piano, three flutes and piccolo, two oboes and English horn, two clarinets, two bassoons, four horns, two trumpets, three trombones and tuba, timpani, cymbals, triangle, celesta, harp, and strings. Performances usually run in the range of 22 to 26 minutes.

References

External links
Program notes on Nights in the Gardens of Spain for the Chicago Symphony Orchestra by Phillip Huscher
The Manuel de Falla Foundation in Spanish and English
EuroArts YouTube (MusikTriennale Köln 1997) - Daniel Barenboim (piano), Plácido Domingo (conductor), Chicago Symphony Orchestra
Frankfurt Radio Symphony YouTube - Javier Perianes (piano), Andrés Orozco-Estrada (conductor) June 10, 2016
Frankfurt Radio Symphony YouTube - Javier Perianes (piano), Pablo Heras-Casado (conductor) August 24, 2017

Compositions by Manuel de Falla
1915 compositions
1910s in Spanish music
Compositions for piano and orchestra
Music with dedications